Kwab may refer to:

Sparisoma chrysopterum, a species of parrotfish also known as kwab or pink kwab
KWAB-TV, a television station in Big Spring, Texas, now known as KCWO-TV

See also
Kwabs (Kwabena Adjepong; born 1990), London-based singer of Ghanaian descent